Rick Woods (June 11, 1948 – September 1, 2012) was an international speedway rider from the United States.

Speedway career 
Woods was a three times North American champion, winning the AMA National Speedway Championship in 1968, 1970 and 1972. He rode in the top tier of British Speedway in 1973, riding for Newport

References 

1948 births
2012 deaths
American speedway riders
Newport Wasps riders
Sportspeople from Newport Beach, California